Villarramiel is a municipality located in the province of Palencia, Castile and León, Spain. According to the 2004 census (INE), the municipality has a population of 1,012 inhabitants.

History 
Villarramiel was founded by Herramel Álvarez, son of Álvaro Herraméliz and his wife, Sancha Sánchez de Pamplona.

Notable people 
 

Apolinar Serrano (1833-1876), Spanish bishop of Havana

References 

 

Municipalities in the Province of Palencia